PC David Copperfield is the pen name of Stuart Davidson, formerly of the Staffordshire Police, who is believed to have been the Internet's first police blogger, who later wrote the best-selling book about the British police service, Wasting Police Time, while serving as a police constable. He is now serving as a police officer in Canada.

Blogging
Copperfield began blogging in 2004; originally writing about his passion for gardening, he found that mentions of his working life in the police attracted far more interest and so he switched to commenting on law and order issues.

In 2005, a number of his blog posts were used without permission by the London-based Mail on Sunday newspaper. The usage of the material attracted protest from fellow bloggers, and Copperfield jokingly described the journalists as 'bastards'. However, the three-page article also attracted the attention of a number of publishers and agents, eventually leading to his first book.

Wasting Police Time
In early 2006 Copperfield signed a book deal with British publisher Monday Books to turn his blog into a book.  For its title, he chose the term wasting police time, a misdemeanour criminal offence under British law. In October 2006, Wasting Police Time was published.  It chronicles Copperfield's despair at the way policing in his towndubbed 'Newtown' (revealed to be Burton upon Trent)stopped functioning properly to a significant extent.

The blurb on the back of the book's dust jacket asks:

His writing revealed the amount of time the UK police now take to deal with relatively petty crimes. He described in detail the hugely complicated paperwork process that meant, for example, that the theft of a bicycle by three boys took around 20 hours (over the course of a month or so) to clear up. This resonated with a British publicand mediathat wondered how so much more money could have been spent on the police service for apparently so little return.

The book was serialised in the Daily Mail, the sister publication of the paper that had earlier printed his material without permission, and Copperfield found himself in great demand from other newspapers and media outlets.

Wasting More Police Time
In February 2012, Monday Books released a sequel to Wasting Police Time, entitled "Wasting More Police Time: Further Adventures in La, La Land". It contains stories from anonymous serving UK police officers including fellow police whistle blower and blogger Inspector Gadget.

Media appearances
Copperfield appeared on the BBC's flagship news show Newsnight, wrote articles for The Daily Telegraph and was written about in almost every British newspaper. Nick Cohen in The Observer named Wasting Police Time one of the three 'most important political books' of the day. Copperfield was invited to appear on the BBC Radio 5 Live chat shows of both Victoria Derbyshire and Simon Mayo. On Jon Gaunt's national Talksport network radio showwhere he appeared twicehe said: "I'm just an ordinary copper who wrote a funny book about what it's like in the police now."

He was invited to discuss criminal justice policy with shadow cabinet membershaving described himself in his book as "conservative with a small c"and was a main speaker at a law-and-order seminar arranged by the Policy Exchange thinktank. However, when Labour Minister of State for Police Tony McNulty MP discussed the book on the floor of the House of Commons in late 2006, he attempted to dismiss it, describing it as "more of a fiction than Dickens".

Until this time, PC Copperfield's real identity had been protected. But in the spring of 2007, Copperfieldaccompanied by his editor from Monday Booksmet producers from the BBC television's Panorama current affairs programme to discuss his 'outing' on their programme. The broadcast aired on 17 September 2007. Copperfield revealed himself to be PC Stuart Davidson of the Staffordshire Police. His fictional "Newtown" was actually the Midlands brewing centre of Burton-upon-Trent.

Shortly before the programme aired, Copperfield was summoned to a meeting with his Chief Constable to discuss his "other career" as a writer. He had evaded his force's Professional Standards Department for several years, but suspicions regarding his secret identity were voiced after he had appeared on GMTV and Sky Newshis face obscured, his voice unalteredas well as numerous radio programmes, to discuss UK policing. By that stage, Davidson had already applied to join Edmonton Police Service (EPS) in Edmonton, Alberta; he left for Canada later the same year, where he now works for the EPS.

In July 2010, Davidson wrote a 1,000-word essay for the Sunday Telegraph explaining how policing in Edmonton was cheaper, quicker and more effective than in the UK, and how this meant, by extension, that forthcoming cuts to UK police budgets need not necessarily mean fewer frontline police on British streets.

References

Living people
English bloggers
British police officers
British emigrants to Canada
Canadian police officers
People from Burton upon Trent
Anonymous bloggers
Year of birth missing (living people)
British male bloggers